Nairn was a burgh constituency that elected one commissioner to the Parliament of Scotland and to the Convention of Estates.

After the Acts of Union 1707, Nairn, Forres, Fortrose and Inverness formed the Inverness district of burghs, returning one member between them to the House of Commons of Great Britain.

List of burgh commissioners
 1567: Name not known
 1617: Alexander Dunbar
 1639–41, 1649: John Tulloch
 1648: John Rose
 1649: Hugh Rose of Kilravock
 1661: John Rose 
 1665 convention: William Rose
 1667 convention: William Rose
 1669–72: Alexander Rose
 1678 convention: David Rose
 1681–2: Hugh Rose, yr of Broadley
 1685–6: Alexander Falconer (son of Bishop Falconer)
 1689 convention: John Rose
 1689–1702: John Rose
 1703–7: John Rose

References
 Joseph Foster, Members of Parliament, Scotland, 1882.

See also
 List of constituencies in the Parliament of Scotland at the time of the Union

Politics of the county of Nairn
Constituencies of the Parliament of Scotland (to 1707)
Constituencies disestablished in 1707
Nairn
1707 disestablishments in Scotland